Karaté Bushido is a French magazine who publishes martial arts stories from around the world. The magazine was founded in 1974, a few months after the death of Bruce Lee. The magazine is also the organizer of the world renowned Festival des Arts Martiaux since 1985.

History 
Founded in 1974, Karate Bushido is the first magazine in France devoted to combat sports including Karate, Taekwondo, Kung Fu, Aikido, Brazilian jiu-jitsu, Muaythai, Kickboxing, Lethwei and more. The magazine was founded by Europ-Mag a few months after the death of Bruce Lee at a time when the world of martial arts was mourning by his death. Lee became the posthumous godfather of the magazine. Since 1985, the magazine is known for organizing the Festival des Arts Martiaux in Bercy, Paris. Karaté Bushido is the oldest magazine dedicated to martial arts in Europe and has been referred as the equivalent to Black Belt magazine in the United States.

Festival des Arts Martiaux 
The Festival des Arts Martiaux is an event founded by Karaté Bushido, held annually at the Accor Arena, previously named Palais Omnisports de Paris-Bercy. Founded in 1985, the festival showcases martial arts masters from around the world. In 2015, to celebrate its 30 years the festival was held at the Palais des congrès de Paris. The festival usually hosts around 10,000 spectators, and received famous headliners over the years such has the Shaolin monks in 1989, Jean-Claude Van Damme in 1990, masters of Okinawa karate in 1993, Rickson Gracie in 1995, Jose Aldo in 2014.

Cover edition 
Notable martial artists that made the cover of the magazine.
  Bruce Lee – 1974
  Jean-Claude Van Damme – 1993
  Bas Rutten – 1997
  Rickson Gracie – 1998
  Jackie Chan – 2000
  Fedor Emelianenko – 2007
  Georges St-Pierre – 2008
  Jérôme Le Banner – 2012
  Francis Ngannou – 2019
  Dave Leduc – 2020

Awards 
MM'Awards 
 2013 French Photographer of the Year (Johann Vayriot, Karaté Bushido)

References

Magazines published in France
Magazines established in 1974
Photojournalistic magazines